The Incredible Base is the only solo studio album by American rapper Rob Base. It was released on November 17, 1989 via Profile Records. Recording sessions took place at Hillside Sound Studio in Englewood, New Jersey. Production was handled by William Hamilton, Rob Base and David Wynn. The album made it to #50 on the Billboard 200 and #20 on Billboard's Top R&B/Hip-Hop Albums chart, and was certified Gold by the Recording Industry Association of America.

Track listing

Charts

Weekly charts

Year-end charts

Certifications

References

External links

1989 albums
Profile Records albums
Rob Base & DJ E-Z Rock albums